Liceo Bicentenario Técnico Profesional de Peralillo is a Chilean high school located in Peralillo, Colchagua Province, Chile.

References 

2011 establishments in Chile
Secondary schools in Chile
Schools in Colchagua Province